KHWK (1380 AM) is a radio station broadcasting a country music format. Licensed to Winona, Minnesota, United States, the station features programming from AP Radio and Westwood One.

It is owned by Leighton Broadcasting, through licensee Leighton Radio Holdings, Inc., and is located at 752 Bluffview Circle, with its other sister stations.

It was originally on 1570 kHz and moved to 1380 kHz in 1958.

Previous logo

References

External links

FCC History Cards for KHWK

Country radio stations in the United States
Radio stations in Minnesota
Radio stations established in 1957
1957 establishments in Minnesota